Slučajni partneri (Accidental Partners) is the fifth studio album by Bosnian-Serbian pop-folk recording artist Seka Aleksić. It was released 14 December 2009 through the record label Grand Production.

Track listing

References

2009 albums
Seka Aleksić albums
Grand Production albums